Dick's Picks Volume 1 is the first album in the Dick's Picks series of live releases by the Grateful Dead. It was recorded on December 19, 1973, at Curtis Hixon Hall in Tampa, Florida, and contains a rare recording of the band playing the blues standard "Nobody's Fault but Mine".

As the first of the Dick's Picks, the album was considered by Deadheads to be a significant breakthrough.  All previous live Dead albums (except Vintage Dead and Historic Dead) had been based on multi-track recordings, which can be remixed extensively before being commercially released.  Dick's Picks were created using stereo (two-track) concert recordings.  This made possible the release of many more Dead shows that exist in the band's extensive tape vault.  The series was named for Grateful Dead tape archivist Dick Latvala.

"Caveat emptor"

Each volume of Dick's Picks has its own "caveat emptor" label, advising the listener of the sound quality of the recording.  The label for volume 1 reads:

"The recording herein has been lovingly remastered directly from the original two-track master tape and is therefore not immune to the various glitches, splices, reel changes and other aural gremlins contained on said original. Dick's Picks differs from our From The Vault series in that we simply did not have access to complete shows (nor the modern mixing capabilities afforded by multitrack tapes). But we think the historical value and musical quality of these tapes more than compensates for any technical anomalies... In other words, what you hear is what you get. And what you get ain't bad!"

Track listing

Disc one

"Here Comes Sunshine" (Jerry Garcia, Robert Hunter) – 14:13
"Big River" (Johnny Cash) – 5:23
"Mississippi Half-Step Uptown Toodeloo" (Garcia, Hunter) – 7:29
"Weather Report Suite" (Eric Andersen, Bob Weir, John Perry Barlow) - 15:56
"Big Railroad Blues" (Noah Lewis) – 4:06
"Playing in the Band" (Weir, Mickey Hart, Hunter) – 21:11

Disc two

"He's Gone" (Garcia, Hunter) – 10:48 →
"Truckin'" (Garcia, Weir, Phil Lesh, Hunter) – 9:18 →
"Nobody's Fault but Mine" (Joseph "Blind Willie" Johnson) – 5:53 →
"Jam" (Garcia, Keith Godchaux, Bill Kreutzmann, Lesh, Weir) – 8:11 →
"The Other One" (Weir, Kreutzmann) – 1:57 →
"Jam" (Garcia, Godchaux, Kreutzmann, Lesh, Weir) – 6:12 →
"Stella Blue" (Garcia, Hunter) – 8:45
"Around and Around" (Chuck Berry) – 5:37

Personnel

Grateful Dead

Jerry Garcia — lead guitar, vocals
Keith Godchaux — keyboards
Bill Kreutzmann — drums
Phil Lesh — bass, vocals
Bob Weir — rhythm guitar, vocals

In the CD liner notes, Donna Jean Godchaux is listed in the band lineup and credited as "giving birth"; she had temporarily stopped touring with the band as she was about to have her first son, Zion.

Production

Kidd Candelario — producer, recording
Dick Latvala — tape archivist
Bruce Polonsky — photography
Gekko Graphics — design
special thanks to Nagra 2791 and Jeff Briss

References

01
1993 live albums